Pyropelta musaica is a species of small sea snail, a deep-water limpet, a marine gastropod mollusks in the family Pyropeltidae.

Distribution
This marine species occurs off the Juan de Fuca Ridge, Northeast Pacific

Habitat 
This small limpet occurs at hydrothermal vents and seeps

References

 McLean J.H. (1992) Cocculiniform limpets (Cocculinidae and Pyropeltidae) living on whale bone in the deep sea off California. Journal of Molluscan Studies 58: 401-414
 Warén, A. & Bouchet, P. (2001) Gastropoda and Monoplacophora from hydrothermal vents and seeps; new taxa and records. The Veliger, 44, 116–231.

External links
 Steffen Kiel, Shell structures of vant and seep Gastropods, Malacologia v. 46 (1) (2004)

Pyropeltidae
Gastropods described in 1987